Kerri Hoskins (born February 20, 1970) is an American former glamour model and video game actress.

Biography
Kerri Hoskins is best known for portraying Sonya Blade in several incarnations of the game beginning with Mortal Kombat 3, replacing Elizabeth Malecki. She toured the United States and Europe portraying Sonya Blade in the Mortal Kombat: Live Tour, appearing at venues like Radio City Music Hall. She also appeared in a number of other games produced by Midway Games including Revolution X and NBA Jam, and is a secret character in NBA Showtime: NBA on NBC. Hoskins trained for two years in Tang Soo Do, a Korean martial art; John Tobias noted her to be "actually very good" and "punching like a guy." She has also modeled for Playboy magazine.

According to a re-published newspaper article dated 2001, Kerri Hoskins was married to Scott Branson and her last name changed to Branson; as of that date, Branson lived in North Aurora, Illinois, where she raises two twin boys who suffer from severe cerebral palsy. She has four children: Leah, Sam, Luke and Zachary. She married Sean Reavis in 2017, and now lives in Batavia. In October 2012, Hoskins ran for a seat on the Kane County, Illinois board.

On October 18th, 2022, Hoskins posted a video to Instagram revealing that her psychologist concluded that she may be on the autism spectrum. She stated that she will be undergoing further evaluation with a specialist before a formal diagnosis would be made.

Video game roles
NBA Jam – cheerleader (1993)
Revolution X – Head Mistress Helga, freeable hostages (1994)
Mortal Kombat 3 – Sonya Blade (1994)
Ultimate Mortal Kombat 3 – Sonya Blade (1994)
Mortal Kombat Trilogy – Sonya Blade (1996)
War Gods – Vallah (1996)
Mortal Kombat Mythologies: Sub-Zero – Kia (1997)
Mortal Kombat 4 – Sonya Blade (1997)
Mortal Kombat Gold – Sonya Blade (including voice) (1999)
NBA Showtime: NBA on NBC – herself (1999)
NBA Jam 2004 (2003)
Killer Instinct – Maya (motion capture) (2013)

Appearances in Playboy Special Editions
Playboy's Nudes December 1992.
Playboy's Book of Lingerie Vol. 29 (January/February 1993) – cover with Jody Hoskins.
Playboy's Girls of Summer '93 (June 1993) – p. 11, 50, 98.
Playboy's Blondes, Brunettes & Redheads (August 1993).
Playboy's Book of Lingerie Vol. 34 (November 1993).
Playboy's Book of Lingerie Vol. 35 (January 1994).
Playboy's Bathing Beauties (March 1994) – p. 34.
Playboy's Book of Lingerie Vol. 36 (March 1994).
Playboy's Book of Lingerie Vol. 39 (September 1994) – p. 32–33, 50–51.
Playboy's Nudes November 1994.
Playboy's Hot Denim Daze (May 1995) – p. 60.
Playboy's Book of Lingerie Vol. 75 (September 2000).

References

External links
 Kerri Ann Gallery
 
 
 2010 interview at The Gaming Liberty

1970 births
20th-century American actresses
21st-century American actresses
Actresses from Minnesota
American video game actresses
American women photographers
Artists from Minnesota
Female models from Minnesota
Living people
People from Cambridge, Minnesota
People from Batavia, Illinois